Prime Minister of Korea may refer to:

 Prime Minister of Korean Empire (1895–1948)
 Prime Minister of South Korea (1948–present)
 Premier of North Korea (1948–present)